Chamaecleini is a tribe of bird dropping moths in the family Noctuidae. There are about 9 genera and 14 described species in Chamaecleini.

Genera
These nine genera belong to the tribe Chamaecleini:
 Aleptinoides Barnes & McDunnough, 1912
 Austrazenia Warren, 1913
 Chalcoecia Hampson, 1908
 Chamaeclea Grote, 1883
 Heminocloa Barnes & Benjamin, 1924
 Hemioslaria Barnes & Benjamin, 1924
 Megalodes Guenee, 1852
 Thurberiphaga Dyar, 1920
 Trogotorna Hampson, 1910

References

Acontiinae